Rancho Tularcitos was a  Mexican land grant in present day Monterey County, California given in 1834 by Governor José Figueroa to Rafael Goméz.  Tularcitos means "place of the little Tule thickets".  The grant was in the upper Carmel Valley, along Tularcitos Creek, and was bounded on the west by Rancho Los Laureles.

History

 

Rafael Goméz (1784-1838), born in Mexico, came to California in 1830 as a legal advisor to Governor Manuel Victoria.  In 1831, he married Joséfa Antonia Estrada (1813-1890), a daughter of José Mariano Estrada, grantee of Rancho Buena Vista.  Goméz was a supporter of Figueroa, but resigned his position, and was granted the six square league Rancho Tularcitos in 1834.  He held public offices in Monterey in 1835-36. Rafael Goméz died in an accident on Rancho Tularcitos in 1838.

With the cession of California to the United States following the Mexican-American War, the 1848 Treaty of Guadalupe Hidalgo provided that the land grants would be honored.  As required by the Land Act of 1851, a claim for Rancho Tularcitos was filed with the Public Land Commission in 1852, and the grant was patented to Joséfa Antonia Estrada de Gomez in 1866.

After Rafael Gomez died in 1838, Joséfa Antonia Gomez married Charles Wolter, a German captain of a Mexican ship, who settled in Monterey in 1833. Joséfa Antonia Goméz sold  Rancho Tularcitos to Andrew J. Ogletree. Ogletree lost the rancho to Alberto Trescony, owner of Rancho San Lucas, in a mortgage foreclosure in 1880. Andrius Blomquist was born in Sweden in 1846 and emigrated to the United States in 1867 to start a new life. A large part of Rancho Tularcitos was sold to John and Robert Marble in 1924. Mike Markkula bought this part, now known as the Rana Creek Ranch, in 1982 from the Marble family.

See also
Ranchos of California
List of Ranchos of California

References

 

California ranchos
Tula
Tula